Thennoor is a small village in Thiruvananthapuram district of Peringammala panjayath in Kerala, India.  Thennoor is a prime tourist spot. The Village is rich with scenic beauty and good climate. Prominent tourist spots include Ponmudi and Mankayam eco tourism.

References 

Villages in Thiruvananthapuram district